The Men's Slalom World Cup 1993/1994 consisted of 8 events.

Final point standings

In Men's Slalom World Cup 1993/94 all results count. Alberto Tomba won his third Slalom World Cup.

See also
 1994 Alpine Skiing World Cup – Men's Slalom

References

External links
 

World Cup
FIS Alpine Ski World Cup slalom men's discipline titles